Limestone wren-babbler has been split into three species:
 Annam limestone babbler, Gypsophila annamensis
 Rufous limestone babbler, Gypsophila calcicola
 Variable limestone babbler, Gypsophila crispifrons

Birds by common name